Eilif Wolff Paulson (25 November 1892 – ??) was a Norwegian economist who served as the second rector of the Norwegian School of Economics (NHH) from 1956-1957.

He was educated from the Norwegian Institute of Technology in Trondheim and was appointed Knight of the Order of St. Olav in 1958.

References

1892 births
Norwegian economists
Norwegian Institute of Technology alumni
Academic staff of the Norwegian School of Economics
Rectors of the Norwegian School of Economics
Year of death missing